Florence Allen may refer to:

 Florence E. Allen (1884–1966), American judge
 Florence Wysinger Allen (1913–1997), African American artists' model
 Flo Allen (footballer) (born 1999), English footballer
 Florence Eliza Allen (1876–1960), American mathematician and women's suffrage activist